The 2009 season of the 3. divisjon, the fourth highest association football league for men in Norway.

Between 22 and 26 games (depending on group size) were played in 24 groups, with 3 points given for wins and 1 for draws. Twelve teams were promoted to the 2. divisjon through playoff.

Tables 

Oslo 1
Lommedalen – lost playoff
Kjelsås 2
KFUM 2
Grüner
Asker 2
Bygdø Monolitten
Sagene
Oldenborg
Vestli
Jutul
Rommen
Kurer – relegated

Oslo 2
Frigg – won playoff
Hasle-Løren
Grorud
Bærum 2
Røa
Bøler
Årvoll
Øvrevoll Hosle
Ullern 2 – relegated
Frognerparken
Vollen – relegated
Holmen – relegated

Oslo 3
Oslo City – won playoff
Nesodden
Nordstrand
Kolbotn
Follo 2
Langhus
Holmlia
Skeid 2
Korsvoll 2 – relegated
Oppsal
Grei – relegated
Lille Tøyen – relegated

Akershus
Høland – lost playoff
Lørenskog 2
Hauerseter
Skedsmo
Fjellhamar
Sørumsand
Strømmen 2
Funnefoss/Vormsund
Gjerdrum
Ull/Kisa 2 – relegated
Eidsvold – relegated
Aurskog/Finstadbru – relegated
Skjetten 2 – relegated
Fet – relegated

Indre Østland 1
Brumunddal – won playoff
Gjøvik FF
Ham-Kam 2
Follebu
Nordre Land
Ringsaker
Moelven
Redalen
Søndre Land
Vind
Fart – relegated
Lom – relegated

Indre Østland 2
Flisa – lost playoff
Sander
Ottestad
Kongsvinger 2
Raufoss 2
Elverum
Løten
Kolbu/KK
Eidskog
Hadeland – relegated
Toten – relegated
Trysil – relegated

Buskerud
Birkebeineren – lost playoff
Jevnaker
Mjøndalen 2
Kongsberg
Vestfossen
Åssiden
Modum
Konnerud
Svelvik
Solberg – relegated
Hokksund – relegated
Åmot – relegated

Østfold
Kvik/Halden – lost playoff
Østsiden
Sprint-Jeløy
Sarpsborg 2
Mysen
Moss 2
Rakkestad
Selbak
Askim
Drøbak/Frogn 2 – relegated
Trøgstad/Båstad
Ås – relegated
Rygge – relegated
Lisleby – relegated

Vestfold
Ørn-Horten – won playoff
Sandefjord 2
FK Tønsberg 2
Eik-Tønsberg
Husøy & Foynland
Tønsberg FK
Flint
Runar
Larvik Turn
Falk
Sandar
Svarstad – pulled team

Telemark
Odd 2 – won playoff
Skarphedin
Notodden 2
Urædd
Tollnes
Skotfoss
Herkules
Pors Grenland 2
Kjapp
Ulefoss
Stathelle og Omegn
Brevik
Sannidal
Klyve – relegated

Agder
Jerv – lost playoff
Lyngdal
Søgne
Trauma
Grane
Gimletroll
Våg
Giv Akt
Donn
Birkenes
Farsund
Vigør – relegated
Tveit – relegated
Mandalskameratene 2 – relegated

Rogaland 1
Vidar – won playoff
Staal Jørpeland
Egersund
Vardeneset
Havørn
Bryne 2
Stavanger 2
Brodd
Sandnes Ulf 2
Sandved
Randaberg 2
Buøy
Hundvåg – relegated
Austrått – relegated

Rogaland 2
Viking 2 – lost playoff
Haugesund 2
Hinna
Klepp
Skjold
Vaulen
Vedavåg Karmøy
Nord
Ålgård 2
Frøyland
Hana
Åkra
Avaldsnes
Djerv 1919 – relegated

Hordaland 1
Austevoll – lost playoff
Brann 2
Vadmyra
Arna-Bjørnar
Askøy
Baune
Vestsiden-Askøy
Smørås
Hald
Bergen Nord
Follese – relegated
Sandviken – relegated

Hordaland 2
Os – won playoff
Tertnes
Lyngbø
Løv-Ham 2
Voss
Norheimsund
Bjarg
Nordhordland
Odda
Hovding
Djerv – relegated
Trio – relegated

Sogn og Fjordane
Førde – won playoff
Tornado Måløy
Årdal
Sogndal 2
Stryn
Høyang
Eid
Jølster
Fjøra
Florø
Vik
Kaupanger – relegated

Sunnmøre
Aalesund 2 – won playoff
Herd
Spjelkavik
Rollon
Hødd 2
Valder
Volda
Brattvåg
Norborg
Godøy
Hareid
Langevåg – relegated

Nordmøre og Romsdal
Kristiansund 2
Træff – lost playoff
Sunndal
Elnesvågen/Omegn
Dahle
Rival
Surnadal
Åndalsnes
Eidsvåg
Averøykameratene
Vestnes Varfjell – relegated
Måndalen – relegated

Trøndelag 1
Kolstad – won playoff
KIL/Hemne
Strindheim 2
Stjørdals-Blink
Rosenborg 3
NTNUI
Buvik
Tangmoen
Tynset
Orkla
Melhus – relegated
Nidelv – relegated

Trøndelag 2
Charlottenlund – lost playoff
Verdal
Tiller
Namsos
Kattem
Malvik
Steinkjer 2
Vuku
Byåsen 2
Neset
Heimdal
Ranheim 2 – relegated

Nordland
Stålkameratene – lost playoff
Innstranden
Steigen
Mosjøen
Brønnøysund
Meløy
Herøy/Dønna
Sandnessjøen
Tverlandet
Fauske/Sprint
Saltdalkameratene – relegated

Hålogaland
Harstad – won playoff
Mjølner
Sortland
Landsås
Lofoten
Skånland
Hardhaus
Grovfjord
Medkila
Leknes
Melbo

Troms
Senja – won playoff
Skarp
Fløya
Bardufoss og Omegn
Skjervøy
Finnsnes
Ishavsbyen
Tromsdalen 2
Lyngen/Karnes
Salangen
Tromsø 3
Nordreisa – relegated

Finnmark
Kirkenes – lost playoff
Hammerfest
Sørøy/Glimt
Bjørnevatn
Porsanger
Kautokeino
Tverrelvdalen
Norild
Alta 2
Bossekop 2 – relegated
Nordkinn

Playoffs

References

Norwegian Third Division seasons
4
Norway
Norway